Oobi was a toy, invented by Herb Fisher of Block Island, Rhode Island and test marketed by Parker Brothers in 1971, that was intended to pass a message to a recipient relying on "the kindness of strangers" as transport.

Physically, an Oobi is a bright orange oblong spheroid with a slit, an addressing area, and big painted-on eyes. They were sold in packs of three. The original purchaser was to write an address on the address area, place a folded message inside, and leave the toy somewhere public to be found. Instructions to the finder were written on the Oobi's top: "I'm oobi. I contain a message to another human being. Please further my journey an inch, a foot, or a mile. Add a note, if you wish. Then help me to the next nice person like yourself! I'm on my way to ... Please don't confine me to a mailbox."

In spite of television advertisements and its slogan "oobi means love" it never caught on during trials on the West Coast and the Northeast, and has been described as the toy company's "wildest failure".

References

External links
 Oobi Land 
1970s toys